Fatal Needles vs. Fatal Fists (Gou hun zhen duo ming quan) is a 1978 Taiwanese kung fu film directed by Lee Tso Nam, and starring Don Wong Tao and Lo Lieh.

Plot 
Meng Hu (Don Wong) and Capt. Chow Lung (Lo Lieh) are local supercops who are cracking down on crime with a vengeance. That is, until several fighters get the drop on Chow who ends up dead. Meng blames himself and retires from crime fighting to become a pathetic drunk, drowning in shame. He finds work at a brothel for a time, until a patron's abuse of one of the girls causes him to interfere despite his refusal to fight. After being wounded, he stumbles to the doorstep of a martial arts school run by Magistrate Chen (Chui Chung Hei). Hoping to stay away from conflict, Meng finds work there, but trouble finds him anyway. A white-haired master named Chung Tung (Chang Yi) tries to bribe Chen into letting opium smugglers into the city. Chen refuses and has acupuncture needles thrust into him that will kill him unless removed by Chung Tung who hopes to control the magistrate. Pushed to the limit, Meng finally comes up with a plan to help beat Chung Tung and save Chen. Sadly, Chen believes his son and daughter are giving into Chung Tung and he removes the needles himself. With nothing holding them back, Meng and Chen's offspring leap into action to take out this pack of drug pushers.

External links 
 Fatal Needles vs. Fatal Fists at Hong Kong Cinemagic
 
 

1978 films
Taiwanese martial arts films
Kung fu films